This is a list of investigational sleep drugs, or drugs for the treatment of sleep disorders that are currently under development for clinical use but are not yet approved. Chemical/generic names are listed first, with developmental code names, synonyms, and brand names in parentheses.

Insomnia

GABAA receptor potentiators
 EVT-201 – GABAA receptor positive allosteric modulator
 Lorediplon (GF-015535-00) – GABAA receptor positive allosteric modulator 
 
 Zuranolone (SAGE-217) – GABAA receptor positive allosteric modulator

Orexin receptor antagonists
 Seltorexant (MIN-202, JNJ,42847922, JNJ-922) – selective OX2 receptor antagonist 
 Vornorexant (ORN-0829, TS-142) – dual OX1 and OX2 receptor antagonist

Melatonin receptor agonists
 Piromelatine (Neu-P11) – melatonin receptor agonist and 5-HT1A and 5-HT1D receptor agonist

Nociceptin receptor agonists
 Sunobinop (IMB-115, IT-1315, S-117957, V-117957) – nociceptin receptor agonist

Hypersomnia/narcolepsy

Orexin receptor agonists
 Danavorexton (TAK-925) – OX2 receptor-selective agonist via IV infusion
 TAK-994 – OX2 receptor agonist pill (orally available)

Monoaminergics
 Flecainide/modafinil (THN-102) – modafinil (dopamine reuptake inhibitor) and flecainide (antiarrhythmic) combination 
 
 Mazindol controlled release (NLS-1001, NLS-1) – norepinephrine-predominant serotonin–norepinephrine–dopamine reuptake inhibitor (SNDRI)
 Reboxetine (AXS-12) – norepinephrine reuptake inhibitor (NRI)

GHB receptor agonists
 FT-218 (sodium oxybate controlled release) – GHB and GABAB receptor agonist

GABAA receptor inhibitors
 
 Pentylenetetrazole (BTD-001) – GABAA receptor negative allosteric modulator

See also
 List of investigational drugs

References

Experimental drugs
Hypnotics
Sleep drugs, investigational
Sedatives
Stimulants